Chennai 600028 is a 2007 Indian Tamil-language sports comedy film written and directed by Venkat Prabhu in his directorial debut. It stars Jai, Shiva, Pa. Ranjith, Premji, Aravind Akash, Nithin Sathya and newcomers Ajay Raj, Vijay Vasanth, Prasanna, Inigo Prabakaran, Karthik and Arun in the lead along with Vijayalakshmi Feroz and Kristine Zedek, making their acting debut as well. The film was produced by S. P. B. Charan along with J. K. Saravana, a Singapore-based award-winning producer. The film's score and soundtrack were composed by Premji Amaran and Yuvan Shankar Raja and also Illayaraja respectively.

The film is based on street cricket played in India, focusing on various themes as friendship, love and rivalry in a suburban area. Following its theatrical release on 27 April 2007, it received critical acclaim and emerged a surprise sleeper hit, running successfully for more than one year in theaters, whilst going on to achieve cult status in the subsequent years. The film's title is derived from the pincode for Mandaveli, a suburb of Chennai, where the story takes place. The success of the film gained the relatively unknown actors – Jai, Shiva, Premji and Nithin Sathya, newcomers Vijayalakshmi, Vijay Vasanth and the director Venkat Prabhu popularity.

The film was also remade in Bengali as Le Chakka (2010), Sinhalese as Super Six (2012), and in Kannada as Bangalore 560023 (2015). A sequel for the film, Chennai 600028 II: Second Innings, has also since been released.

Plot
The story revolves around two local cricket league teams that compete against each other in local matches and consider each other as sworn enemies. Royapuram Rockers are on top of the chain and keep bashing the Sharks year after year. The heroes of the movie are the Sharks' team.

The story begins when Raghu's parents move from Royapuram to Visalakshi Thottam, Chennai 600 028. Raghu is a member of the Royapuram Rockers Cricket team, and a college student living with his parents. He has no choice but to move with them although he detests the area. He is not very excited at the prospect of living in the same area as his sworn enemies. Raghu is faithful to his teammates, but they ignore him because of the distance. Angered at being replaced by a new guy in the team in one of the matches, Raghu estranges himself from cricket and the Rockers.

Raghu informs of Pazhani's sister Selvi's love for Karthik to him. This incident initiates Raghu's friendship with a few Sharks team players and eventually gets induced into the team. Raghu practices with the Sharks to play against the Rockers in the upcoming Radio Mirchi trophy. Pazhani, who soon learns of his sister and Karthik's love affair is disappointed and then there is a tiff amongst the friends. The team splits up for a while, but Karthik apologizes to Pazhani and they make up. The team reunites and starts practicing for the trophy once again. Unfortunately, Karthik is stabbed by his brother's enemies and is rendered unfit to play the match. Pazhani replaces Karthik as the captain and the team heads for the match.

Under tight pressure and with a nail biting finish, the Sharks finally defeat the Rockers in the semi-finals of the tournament. In the finals they meet their enemies, a group of school kids named Bad Boys-II who practice by bunking school to play cricket on the beach. The kids are really good and the Sharks know it because they have lost badly to them once before.

The movie ends with the team really struggling to keep it up in the game.

Cast

 Jai as Raghuvaran "Raghu
 Shiva as Karthik"
 Premji as Seenivasan "Seenu"
 Aravind Akash as Aravind
 Nithin Sathya as Pazhani
 Vijay Vasanth as Gopi
 Ajay Raj as Ezhumalai
 Prassanna as Shanmugham
 Ranjith as Imran
 Arun as Uday
 Karthik Preath as Arivazhagan "Arivu"
 Sampath Raj as Guna
 Ilavarasu as Manohar
 Vijayalakshmi Feroz as Selvi
 Kristine Zedek as Swetha
 Badava Gopi as Commentator
 Sakthi Saravanan as Aravind's boss
 Inigo Prabakaran as John (Rockers's captain)
 Mai Prakash as Rocker's team player
 Sundar as Jeeva
 Hari Prashanth as Hari, Bad Boys' captain
 S. N. Surendar as Sampath, Raghu's father
 Neelu Nasreen as Guna's wife
 Srilatha as Durga, Raghu's mother
 Shanmugasundaram as Sports minister
 Sam Anderson as David
 Mirchi Senthil as Radio Mirchi RJ (special appearance)
 Kalyan special appearance in "Saroja Saman Nikalo" song
 Pa. Ranjith as a player
 Karunas as himself in a fight scene

Production
Chennai 600028 is the directorial debut of Venkat Prabhu. He initially titled the film as Enga Area Ulla Varaadha (Don't come into our territory), from the opening song in Pudhupettai, but lyricist Vaali was critical of the idea, feeling that the title was "negative" sounding. Subsequently, the film was renamed as Chennai 600028, with the idea of including the area's postcode taken from the title of the American television series Beverly Hills, 90210. Venkat Prabhu felt the new title was "more apt and universal".

Soundtrack

The film's score was composed by Venkat Prabhu's brother, Premji Amaran, while his cousin, Yuvan Shankar Raja composed the soundtrack, which also featured two tracks that were rearranged by Premji. The soundtrack album, featuring 9 tracks, released on 19 February 2007 in India and four days later in Singapore and Malaysia, on 23 February 2007. The audio was launched at the radio station Radio Mirchi, broadcasting all the songs live, which was said to be the first time in India. The lyrics were written by 'Kavignar' Vaali and Gangai Amaran, father of Venkat Prabhu. Also, composer Yuvan Shankar Raja penned the lyrics for the song "Natpukullae", besides singing it. 19 singers had rendered their voice for the songs, including Yogi B, DJ Funky Sathiya and SilveStar, two Singaporean rappers, actor Karunas, director Venkat Prabhu and producer S. P. B. Charan.

The album was both critically acclaimed and gained immense popularity upon its release, being described as, "excellent", a "rocking album" and one of the "aesthetic highlights" of the film. The songs were said to be a big hit as reportedly 25000 CDs were sold on the very first day, "ruling the charts" worldwide. The songs "Jalsa" and "Saroja Saman Nikalo" were "rocking the dance floors".

Release and reception 
Chennai 600028 was released on 27 April 2007, and emerged as a major commercial success. Sify in their review stated that "All the guys who acted in the film are candid and have let their hair down. RJ Shiva is the surprise packet in the film. Venkat Prabhu deserves a pat on his back for making a breezy fun movie which highlights the fact that cricket in India which is a religion for many is also won through team spirit and sacrifice. So go ahead, make your matinee and enjoy the match." Filmibeat reviewed it as "Apart from cricket there is enough space for love, friendship, sentiments and decent comedy in the script." Baradwaj Rangan reviewed the film as "A street-cricket saga from a bunch of no-names comes out of nowhere and knocks your socks off." Writing for Rediff, the review stated as "The movie is a result of a perfect team effort in every sense. A perfect entertainer, not to be missed."

The film emerged as a sleeper hit at the box office, and also emerging as the cult status, in coming years. The film's 100th day celebrations, took place on 5 August 2007 at Chennai Trade Centre, with Rajinikanth and Kamal Hassan being the chief guest. The film is later dubbed in Telugu as Kodithe Kottalira in 2009.

Remakes 
The film was remade in Bengali as Le Chakka (2009), and in Kannada as Bangalore 560023 (2015). The film was also remade in Sinhalese as Super Six in 2012.

Sequel

Plans to make a sequel to Chennai 600028 were reported several times in the media, shortly after the first film's release. It features several cast members from the earlier film including Jai, Shiva, Premji, Aravind Akash and Nithin Sathya. Actors Vaibhav, Subbu Panchu, Abhinay Vaddi were chosen to play supporting roles in the film. Production of the film was officially unveiled on 28 February 2016 and the film was released on 9 December 2016.

Awards and nominations
 Vijay Awards
 Vijay Award for Best Crew
 Vijay Award for Best Find of the Year - Venkat Prabhu
 Nominated - Vijay Award for Best Film
 Nominated - Vijay Award for Best Director - Venkat Prabhu
 Nominated - Vijay Award for Best Story, Screenplay Writer - Venkat Prabhu
 Nominated - Vijay Award for Best Debut Actor - Shiva
 Nominated - Vijay Award for Best Debut Actress - Vijayalakshmi Ahathian
 Nominated - Vijay Award for Best Editor - B. Lenin
 Nominated - Vijay Award for Best Lyricist - Vaali
 Nominated - Vijay Award for Best Male Playback Singer - S. P. Balasubrahmanyam
 Nominated - Vijay Award for Best Choreographer - Ajay Raj

 Tamil Nadu State Film Awards
Tamil Nadu State Film Award for Best Family Film

See also 
 Kodambakkam, Chennai

References

External links
 

2007 films
2000s Tamil-language films
2000s buddy comedy films
2000s sports comedy films
Culture of Chennai
Films scored by Yuvan Shankar Raja
Films about cricket in India
Films directed by Venkat Prabhu
Indian buddy comedy films
Indian sports comedy films
Tamil films remade in other languages
2007 directorial debut films
2007 comedy films